The 59th Annual Grammy Awards ceremony was held on February 12, 2017. The CBS network broadcast the show live from the Staples Center in Los Angeles. The ceremony recognized the best recordings, compositions, and artists of the eligibility year, which ran from October 1, 2015, to September 30, 2016.

James Corden hosted the ceremony for the first time. The pre-telecast ceremony (officially named The Premiere Ceremony) was held on the same day prior to the main event and was hosted by comedian Margaret Cho.

The nominations were announced on December 6, 2016. Beyoncé acquired the most nominations with nine. Drake, Rihanna, and Kanye West received eight nominations each, while Chance the Rapper followed with seven nominations. Tom Elmhirst won six awards from six nominations as an engineer/mixer. Among the artists, Adele was the biggest winner of the night with five trophies, including Album of the Year for 25, Record of the Year, and Song of the Year for "Hello". Adele also became the first musician in history to win all three general field awards in the same ceremony twice, previously winning all three categories in 2012. David Bowie and Greg Kurstin followed with four trophies. Chance the Rapper won for Best New Artist alongside two other awards.

Performers
Performers adapted from International Business Times.

Presenters
Source: Grammy.com

Jennifer Lopez – presented Best New Artist
Paris Jackson – introduced The Weeknd and Daft Punk
John Travolta – introduced Keith Urban and Carrie Underwood
Nick Jonas – presented Best Pop Duo/Group Performance
Katharine McPhee and The Chainsmokers – presented Best Rock Song
Ryan Seacrest – introduced Lukas Graham and Kelsea Ballerini
Tina Knowles – introduced Beyoncé
Camila Cabello and Thomas Rhett – presented Best Country Solo Performance 
Little Big Town – introduced Katy Perry and Skip Marley
William Bell and Gary Clark Jr. – presented Best Urban Contemporary Album
Gina Rodriguez – introduced Maren Morris and Alicia Keys
Taraji P. Henson – presented Best Rap Album
Laverne Cox – introduced Metallica and Lady Gaga
Dwight Yoakam – introduced Sturgill Simpson
DNCE – introduced Demi Lovato, Tori Kelly, Little Big Town and Andra Day
Celine Dion – presented Song of the Year
Solange – introduced A Tribe Called Quest and Anderson .Paak
Halsey and Jason Derulo – introduced Chance the Rapper and Kirk Franklin
Tim McGraw and Faith Hill – presented Record of the Year and Album of the Year

Premiere ceremony
In order of appearance:
Margaret Cho - main host (presented Rock, Pop, Producer and Visual Media categories and Best Musical Theater Album)
Lauren Daigle and For King and Country (presented Gospel/Contemporary Christian, Engineering (Non Classical), Packaging and Arranging categories and Best Historical Album, Best Album Notes, Best Surround Sound Album and Best Instrumental Composition)
O'Connor Band - "Ruby, Are You Mad At Your Man?"
René Marie (presented Gospel categories, Best New Age Album, Best World Music Album, Best Children's Album, Best Spoken Word Album, Best Music Video and Best Music Film)
Ravi Coltrane and Third Coast Percussion - "Mallet Quartet"
Sarah Jarosz (presented Classical, Engineering (Classical) and Dance categories)
Judy Collins - "Suzanne" (Tribute to Leonard Cohen)
Brendon Urie (presented Best Contemporary Instrumental Album, Jazz, Country categories and Best Roots Gospel Album)
Northern Cree and Carla Morrison - "Cree Cuttin'"/"Un Beso" 
Mya (presented Latin and American Roots categories)
Ziggy Marley - "Amen"
Jimmy Jam (presented R&B and Rap categories and Best Reggae Album, Best Comedy Album)

Nominees and winners
 Taken from the Grammys website.
 The winners are in bold.

General
Record of the Year
"Hello" – Adele
Greg Kurstin, producer; Julian Burg, Tom Elmhirst, Emile Haynie, Greg Kurstin, Liam Nolan, Alex Pasco & Joe Visciano, engineers/mixers; Tom Coyne & Randy Merrill, mastering engineers
"Formation" – Beyoncé
Beyoncé Knowles, Mike Will Made-It & Pluss, producers; Jaycen Joshua & Stuart White, engineers/mixers; Dave Kutch, mastering engineer
"7 Years" – Lukas Graham
Future Animals & Pilo, producers; Delbert Bowers, Sebastian Fogh, Stefan Forrest & David LaBrel, engineers/mixers; Tom Coyne, mastering engineer
"Work" – Rihanna featuring Drake
Boi-1da, producer; Noel "Gadget" Campbell, Kuk Harrell, Manny Marroquin, Noah "40" Shebib & Marcos Tovar, engineers/mixers; Chris Gehringer, mastering engineer
"Stressed Out" – Twenty One Pilots
Mike Elizondo & Tyler Joseph, producers; Neal Avron & Adam Hawkins, engineers/mixers; Chris Gehringer, mastering engineer

Album of the Year
 25 – Adele
 Danger Mouse, Samuel Dixon, Paul Epworth, Greg Kurstin, Max Martin, Ariel Rechtshaid, Shellback, The Smeezingtons & Ryan Tedder, producers; Julian Burg, Austen Jux Chandler, Cameron Craig, Samuel Dixon, Tom Elmhirst, Declan Gaffney, Serban Ghenea, John Hanes, Emile Haynie, Jan Holzner, Michael Ilbert, Chris Kasych, Greg Kurstin, Charles Moniz, Liam Nolan, Alex Pasco, Mike Piersante, Ariel Rechtshaid, Rich Rich, Dave Schiffman, Joe Visciano & Matt Wiggins, engineers/mixers; Tom Coyne & Randy Merrill, mastering engineers
Lemonade – Beyoncé
James Blake, Kendrick Lamar, The Weeknd & Jack White, featured artists; Vincent Berry II, Ben Billions, James Blake, Boots, Jonny Coffer, DannyBoyStyles, Michael Dean, Alex Delicata, Diplo, Derek Dixie, Kevin Garrett, Diana Gordon, HazeBanga, Hit-Boy, Just Blaze, King Henry, Beyoncé Knowles, Ezra Koenig, Jeremy McDonald, MeLo-X, Mike Will Made-It, Pluss, Jack White & Malik Yusef, producers; Mike Dean, Jaycen Joshua, Greg Koller, Tony Maserati, Lester Mendoza, Vance Powell, Joshua V. Smith & Stuart White, engineers/mixers; Dave Kutch, mastering engineer
Purpose – Justin Bieber
Big Sean, Diplo, Halsey, Travis Scott & Skrillex, featured artists; The Audibles, Axident, Justin Bieber, Big Taste, Benny Blanco, Blood, Jason "Poo Bear" Boyd, Scott "Scooter" Braun, Mike Dean, Diplo, Gladius, Josh Gudwin, Nico Hartikainen, Mark "The Mogul" Jackson, Steve James, Ian Kirkpatrick, Maejor, MdL, Skrillex, Jeremy Snyder & Soundz, producers; Simon Cohen, Diplo, Mark "Exit" Goodchild, Josh Gudwin, Jaycen Joshua, Manny Marroquin, Chris "Tek" O'Ryan, Johannes Raassina, Gregg Rominiecki, Chris Sclafani, Skrillex, Dylan William & Andrew Wuepper, engineers/mixers; Tom Coyne & Randy Merrill, mastering engineers
Views – Drake
dvsn, Future, Kyla, PartyNextDoor, Rihanna & Wizkid, featured artists; Brian Alexander-Morgan, Axlfoliethc, Beat Bully, Boi-1Da, Cardo, Dwayne "Supa Dups" Chin-Quee, Daxz, DJ Dahi, Frank Dukes, Maneesh, Murda Beatz, Nineteen85, Ricci Riera, Allen Ritter, Noah "40" Shebib, Southside, Sevn Thomas, Jordan Ullman, Kanye West, Wizkid & Young Exclusive, producers; Noel Cadastre, Noel "Gadget" Campbell, Seth Firkins, David "Prep" Bijan Huges & Noah "40" Shebib, engineers/mixers; Chris Athens, mastering engineer
A Sailor's Guide to Earth – Sturgill Simpson
Sturgill Simpson, producer; Geoff Allan, David Ferguson & Sean Sullivan, engineers/mixers; Gavin Lurssen, mastering engineer

Song of the Year
 "Hello"
 Adele Adkins & Greg Kurstin, songwriters (Adele)
 "Formation" 
 Khalif Brown, Asheton Hogan, Beyoncé Knowles & Michael L. Williams II, songwriters (Beyoncé)
 "I Took a Pill in Ibiza"
 Mike Posner, songwriter (Mike Posner)
 "Love Yourself"
 Justin Bieber, Benjamin Levin & Ed Sheeran, songwriters (Justin Bieber)
 "7 Years"
 Lukas Forchhammer, Stefan Forrest, Morten Pilegaard & Morten Ristorp, songwriters (Lukas Graham)

Best New Artist
Chance the Rapper
Kelsea Ballerini
The Chainsmokers
Maren Morris
Anderson .Paak

Pop
Best Pop Solo Performance
 "Hello" – Adele
 "Hold Up" – Beyoncé
 "Love Yourself" – Justin Bieber
 "Piece by Piece" (Idol Version) – Kelly Clarkson
 "Dangerous Woman" – Ariana Grande

Best Pop Duo/Group Performance
 "Stressed Out" – Twenty One Pilots
 "Closer" – The Chainsmokers featuring Halsey
 "7 Years" – Lukas Graham
 "Work" – Rihanna featuring Drake
 "Cheap Thrills" – Sia featuring Sean Paul

Best Traditional Pop Vocal Album
 Summertime: Willie Nelson Sings Gershwin – Willie Nelson Cinema – Andrea Bocelli
 Fallen Angels – Bob Dylan
 Stages Live – Josh Groban
 Encore: Movie Partners Sing Broadway – Barbra Streisand

Best Pop Vocal Album
 25 – Adele Purpose – Justin Bieber
 Dangerous Woman – Ariana Grande
 Confident – Demi Lovato
 This Is Acting – Sia

Dance/Electronic
Best Dance Recording
 "Don't Let Me Down" – The Chainsmokers featuring Daya The Chainsmokers, producers; Jordan Young, mixer "Tearing Me Up" – Bob Moses
Bob Moses, producers; Mark "Spike" Stent, mixer
 "Never Be Like You" – Flume featuring Kai
 Harley Streten, producer; Eric J Dubowsky, mixer
 "'Rinse & Repeat" – Riton featuring Kah-Lo
 Riton, producer; Wez Clarke, mixer
 "Drinkee" – Sofi Tukker
 Sofi Tukker, producers; Bryan Wilson, mixer

Best Dance/Electronic Album
 Skin – Flume Electronica 1: The Time Machine – Jean-Michel Jarre  
 Epoch – Tycho
 Barbara Barbara, We Face a Shining Future – Underworld
 Louie Vega Starring...XXVIII – Little Louie Vega

Contemporary Instrumental
Best Contemporary Instrumental Album
 Culcha Vulcha – Snarky Puppy Human Nature – Herb Alpert
 When You Wish Upon a Star – Bill Frisell  
 Way Back Home: Live from Rochester, NY – Steve Gadd Band
 Unspoken – Chuck Loeb

Rock
Best Rock Performance
 "Blackstar" – David Bowie "Joe" (Live from Austin City Limits) – Alabama Shakes
 "Don't Hurt Yourself" – Beyoncé featuring Jack White  
 "The Sound of Silence" (Live on Conan) – Disturbed
 "Heathens" – Twenty One Pilots

Best Metal Performance
 "Dystopia" – Megadeth "Shock Me" – Baroness
 "Silvera" – Gojira
 "Rotting in Vain" – Korn
 "The Price Is Wrong" – Periphery

Best Rock Song
 "Blackstar" David Bowie, songwriter (David Bowie) "Burn the Witch" 
 Radiohead, songwriters (Radiohead)
 "Hardwired"
 James Hetfield & Lars Ulrich, songwriters (Metallica)
 "Heathens"
 Tyler Joseph, songwriter (Twenty One Pilots)
 "My Name Is Human"
 Rich Meyer, Ryan Meyer & Johnny Stevens, songwriters (Highly Suspect)

Best Rock Album
 Tell Me I'm Pretty – Cage the Elephant California – Blink-182
 Magma – Gojira
 Death of a Bachelor – Panic! at the Disco
 Weezer – Weezer

Alternative
Best Alternative Music Album
 Blackstar – David Bowie 22, A Million – Bon Iver
 The Hope Six Demolition Project – PJ Harvey
 Post Pop Depression – Iggy Pop
 A Moon Shaped Pool – Radiohead

R&B
Best R&B Performance
 "Cranes in the Sky" – Solange "Turnin' Me Up" – BJ the Chicago Kid
 "Permission" – Ro James
 "I Do" – Musiq Soulchild
 "Needed Me" – Rihanna

Best Traditional R&B Performance
 "Angel" – Lalah Hathaway "The Three of Me" – William Bell
 "Woman's World" – BJ the Chicago Kid
 "Sleeping with the One I Love" – Fantasia
 "Can't Wait" – Jill Scott

Best R&B Song
 "Lake by the Ocean" Hod David & Musze, songwriters (Maxwell) "Come and See Me"
 J. Brathwaite, Aubrey Graham & Noah Shebib, songwriters (PartyNextDoor featuring Drake)
 "Exchange"
 Michael Hernandez & Bryson Tiller, songwriters (Bryson Tiller)
 "Kiss It Better"
 Jeff Bhasker, Robyn Fenty, John-Nathan Glass & Teddy Sinclair, songwriters (Rihanna)
 "Luv"
 Magnus August Høiberg, Benjamin Levin & Daystar Peterson, songwriters (Tory Lanez)

Best Urban Contemporary Album
  Lemonade – Beyoncé Ology – Gallant
 We Are King – KING
 Malibu – Anderson .Paak
 Anti – Rihanna

Best R&B Album
 Lalah Hathaway Live – Lalah Hathaway In My Mind – BJ the Chicago Kid
 Velvet Portraits – Terrace Martin
 Healing Season – Mint Condition
 Smoove Jones – Mýa

Rap
Best Rap Performance
 "No Problem" – Chance the Rapper featuring Lil Wayne & 2 Chainz "Panda" – Desiigner
 "Pop Style" – Drake featuring The Throne
 "All the Way Up" – Fat Joe & Remy Ma featuring French Montana & Infared
 "THat Part" – ScHoolboy Q featuring Kanye West

Best Rap/Sung Performance
 "Hotline Bling" – Drake "Freedom" – Beyoncé featuring Kendrick Lamar
 "Broccoli" – DRAM featuring Lil Yachty
 "Ultralight Beam" – Kanye West featuring Chance the Rapper, Kelly Price, Kirk Franklin & The-Dream
 "Famous" – Kanye West featuring Rihanna and Swizz Beatz

Best Rap Song
 "Hotline Bling" Aubrey Graham & Paul Jefferies, songwriters (Drake) "All the Way Up"
 Joseph Cartagena, Edward Davadi, Shandel Green, Karim Kharbouch, Andre Christopher Lyon, Reminisce Mackie & Marcello Valenzano, songwriters (Fat Joe & Remy Ma featuring French Montana & Infared)
 "Famous"
 Chancellor Bennett, Ross Birchard, Ernest Brown, Andrew Dawson, Kasseem Dean, Mike Dean, Noah Goldstein, Kejuan Muchita, Patrick Reynolds, Kanye West, Cydel Young & Malik Yusef, songwriters (Kanye West featuring Rihanna)
 "No Problem"
 Chancellor Bennett, Dwayne Carter, Rachel Cato, Peter Cottontale, Tauheed Epps, Jonathan Hoard, Cam O'bi, Ivan Rosenberg, Conor Szymanski, Lakeithsha Williams & Jaime Woods, songwriters (Chance the Rapper featuring Lil Wayne and 2 Chainz)
 "Ultralight Beam"
 Chancellor Bennett, Kasseem Dean, Mike Dean, Kirk Franklin, Noah Goldstein, Samuel Griesemer, Terius Nash, Jerome Potter, Kelly Price, Nico "Donnie Trumpet" Segal, Derek Watkins, Kanye West, Cydel Young & Malik Yusef, songwriters (Kanye West featuring Chance The Rapper, Kelly Price, Kirk Franklin & The-Dream)

Best Rap Album
  Coloring Book – Chance the Rapper and the Anonymous Nobody... – De La Soul 
 Major Key – DJ Khaled 
 Views – Drake
 Blank Face LP – ScHoolboy Q
 The Life of Pablo – Kanye West

Country
Best Country Solo Performance
 "My Church" – Maren Morris "Love Can Go to Hell" – Brandy Clark 
 "Vice" – Miranda Lambert 
 "Church Bells" – Carrie Underwood
 "Blue Ain't Your Color" – Keith Urban
Best Country Duo/Group Performance
 "Jolene" – Pentatonix featuring Dolly Parton "Different for Girls" – Dierks Bentley featuring Elle King
 "21 Summer" – Brothers Osborne 
 "Setting the World on Fire" – Kenny Chesney & Pink
 "Think of You" – Chris Young with Cassadee Pope
Best Country Song
 "Humble and Kind" Lori McKenna, songwriter (Tim McGraw) "Blue Ain't Your Color"
 Clint Lagerberg, Hillary Lindsey & Steven Lee Olsen, songwriters (Keith Urban)
 "Die a Happy Man"
 Sean Douglas, Thomas Rhett & Joe Spargur, songwriters (Thomas Rhett)
 "My Church"
 busbee & Maren Morris, songwriters (Maren Morris)
 "Vice"
 Miranda Lambert, Shane McAnally & Josh Osborne, songwriters (Miranda Lambert)

Best Country Album
 A Sailor's Guide to Earth – Sturgill Simpson Big Day in a Small Town – Brandy Clark
 Full Circle – Loretta Lynn 
 Hero – Maren Morris
 Ripcord – Keith Urban

New Age
Best New Age Album
 White Sun II – White Sun Orogen – John Burke
 Dark Sky Island – Enya 
 Inner Passion – Peter Kater & Tina Guo 
 Rosetta – Vangelis

Jazz
Best Improvised Jazz Solo
 "I'm So Lonesome I Could Cry" – John Scofield, soloist "Countdown" – Joey Alexander, soloist
 "In Movement" – Ravi Coltrane, soloist
 "We See" – Fred Hersch, soloist
 "I Concentrate on You" – Brad Mehldau, soloist

Best Jazz Vocal Album
 Take Me to the Alley – Gregory Porter Sound of Red – René Marie
 Upward Spiral – Branford Marsalis Quartet with special guest Kurt Elling
 Harlem on My Mind – Catherine Russell
 The Sting Variations – The Tierney Sutton Band

Best Jazz Instrumental Album
 Country for Old Men – John Scofield Book of Intuition – Kenny Barron Trio
 Dr. Um – Peter Erskine
 Sunday Night at the Vanguard – The Fred Hersch Trio
 Nearness – Joshua Redman & Brad Mehldau

Best Large Jazz Ensemble Album
 Presidential Suite: Eight Variations on Freedom – Ted Nash Big Band Real Enemies – Darcy James Argue's Secret Society
 MONK'estra, Vol. 1 – John Beasley
 Kaleidoscope Eyes: Music of the Beatles – John Daversa
 All L.A. Band – Bob Mintzer

Best Latin Jazz Album
 Tribute to Irakere: Live in Marciac – Chucho Valdés Entre Colegas – Andy González
 Madera Latino: A Latin Jazz Perspective on the Music of Woody Shaw – Brian Lynch & various artists
 Canto América – Michael Spiro/Wayne Wallace La Orquesta Sinfonietta
 30 – Trio Da Paz

Gospel/Contemporary Christian Music
Best Gospel Performance/Song
 "God Provides" – Tamela Mann Kirk Franklin, songwriter "It's Alright, It's OK" – Shirley Caesar featuring Anthony Hamilton
 Stanley Brown & Courtney Rumble, songwriters
 "You're Bigger [Live]" – Jekalyn Carr 
 Allundria Carr, songwriter
 "Made a Way [Live]" – Travis Greene
 Travis Greene, songwriter
 "Better" – Hezekiah Walker
 Jason Clayborn, Gabriel Hatcher & Hezekiah Walker, songwriters

Best Contemporary Christian Music Performance/Song
 "Thy Will" – Hillary Scott & The Scott Family Bernie Herms, Hillary Scott & Emily Weisband, songwriters "Trust in You" – Lauren Daigle
 Lauren Daigle, Michael Farren & Paul Mabury, songwriters
 "Priceless" – For King & Country 
 Benjamin Backus, Seth Mosley, Joel Smallbone, Luke Smallbone & Tedd Tjornhom, songwriters
 "King of the World" – Natalie Grant
 Natalie Grant, Becca Mizell & Samuel Mizell, songwriters
 "Chain Breaker" – Zach Williams
 Mia Fieldes, Jonathan Smith & Zach Williams, songwriters

Best Gospel Album
 Losing My Religion – Kirk Franklin Listen – Tim Bowman, Jr.
 Fill This House – Shirley Caesar 
 A Worshipper's Heart [Live] – Todd Dulaney
 Demonstrate [Live] – William Murphy

Best Contemporary Christian Music Album
 Love Remains – Hillary Scott & The Scott Family Poets & Saints – All Sons & Daughters
 American Prodigal – Crowder 
 Be One – Natalie Grant
 Youth Revival [Live] – Hillsong Young & Free

Best Roots Gospel Album
 Hymns That Are Important to Us – Joey + Rory Better Together – Gaither Vocal Band
 Nature's Symphony in 432 – The Isaacs 
 Hymns and Songs of Inspiration – Gordon Mote
 God Don't Never Change: The Songs of Blind Willie Johnson – (Various Artists); Jeffrey Gaskill, producer

Latin
Best Latin Pop Album
 Un Besito Más – Jesse & Joy Ilusión – Gaby Moreno
 Similares – Laura Pausini
 Seguir Latiendo – Sanalejo
 Buena Vida – Diego Torres

Best Latin Rock, Urban or Alternative Album
 iLevitable – ile L.H.O.N. (La Humanidad o Nosotros) – Illya Kuryaki and the Valderramas
 Buenaventura – La Santa Cecilia
 Los Rakas – Los Rakas
 Amor Supremo – Carla Morrison

Best Regional Mexican Music Album (Including Tejano)
 Un Azteca en el Azteca, Vol. 1 (En Vivo) – Vicente Fernández Raíces – Banda El Recodo de Cruz Lizárraga
 Hecho a Mano – Joss Favela
 Generación Maquinaria Est. 2006 – La Maquinaria Norteña
 Tributo a Joan Sebastian y Rigoberto Alfaro – Mariachi Divas de Cindy Shea

Best Tropical Latin Album
 Donde Están? – Jose Lugo & Guasábara Combo Conexión – Fonseca
 La Fantasia Homenaje a Juan Formell – Formell y Los Van Van
 35 Aniversario – Grupo Niche
 La Sonora Santanera en Su 60 Aniversario – Sonora Santanera

American Roots
Best American Roots Performance
 "House of Mercy" – Sarah Jarosz "Ain't No Man" – The Avett Brothers
 "Mother's Children Have a Hard Time" – The Blind Boys of Alabama
 "Factory Girl" – Rhiannon Giddens
 "Wreck You" – Lori McKenna

Best American Roots Song
 "Kid Sister" Vince Gill, songwriter (The Time Jumpers) "Alabama at Night"
 Robbie Fulks, songwriter (Robbie Fulks)
 "City Lights"
 Jack White, songwriter (Jack White/The White Stripes)
 "Gulfstream" 
 Eric Adcock & Roddie Romero, songwriters (Roddie Romero and the Hub City All-Stars)
 "Wreck You"
 Lori McKenna & Felix McTeigue, songwriters (Lori McKenna)

Best Americana Album
 This Is Where I Live – William Bell True Sadness – The Avett Brothers
 The Cedar Creek Sessions – Kris Kristofferson
 The Bird and the Rifle – Lori McKenna
 Kid Sister – The Time Jumpers

Best Bluegrass Album
 Coming Home – O'Connor Band with Mark O'Connor Original Traditional – Blue Highway
 Burden Bearer – Doyle Lawson & Quicksilver
 The Hazel and Alice Sessions – Laurie Lewis & The Right Hands
 North by South – Claire Lynch

Best Traditional Blues Album
 Porcupine Meat – Bobby Rush Can't Shake the Feeling – Lurrie Bell
 Live at the Greek Theatre – Joe Bonamassa 
 Blues & Ballads (A Folksinger's Songbook: Volumes I & II) – Luther Dickinson
 The Soul of Jimmie Rodgers – Vasti Jackson

Best Contemporary Blues Album
 The Last Days of Oakland – Fantastic Negrito Love Wins Again – Janiva Magness 
 Bloodline – Kenny Neal
 Give It Back to You – The Record Company
 Everybody Wants a Piece – Joe Louis Walker

Best Folk Album
 Undercurrent – Sarah Jarosz Silver Skies Blue – Judy Collins & Ari Hest
 Upland Stories – Robbie Fulks 
 Factory Girl – Rhiannon Giddens
 Weighted Mind – Sierra Hull

Best Regional Music Album
 E Walea – Kalani Pe'a Broken Promised Land – Barry Jean Ancelet & Sam Broussard
 It's a Cree Thing – Northern Cree
 Gulfstream – Roddie Romero and the Hub City All-Stars
 I Wanna Sing Right: Rediscovering Lomax in the Evangeline Country – (Various Artists); Joshua Caffery & Joel Savoy, producers

Reggae
Best Reggae Album
 Ziggy Marley – Ziggy Marley Sly & Robbie Presents... Reggae For Her – Devin Di Dakta & J.L
 Rose Petals – J Boog
 Everlasting – Raging Fyah
 Falling Into Place – Rebelution
 SOJA: Live in Virginia – SOJA

World Music
Best World Music Album
 Sing Me Home – Yo-Yo Ma & The Silk Road Ensemble Destiny – Celtic Woman
 Walking in the Footsteps of Our Fathers – Ladysmith Black Mambazo
 Land of Gold – Anoushka Shankar
 Dois Amigos, Um Século de Música: Multishow Live – Caetano Veloso & Gilberto Gil

Children's
Best Children's Album
 Infinity Plus One – Secret Agent 23 Skidoo Explorer of the World – Frances England
 Novelties – Recess Monkey
 Press Play – Brady Rymer And The Little Band That Could
 Saddle Up – The Okee Dokee Brothers

Spoken Word
Best Spoken Word Album (includes Poetry, Audio Books and Storytelling)
 In Such Good Company: Eleven Years of Laughter, Mayhem, and Fun in the Sandbox – Carol Burnett The Girl with the Lower Back Tattoo – Amy Schumer
 M Train – Patti Smith
 Under The Big Black Sun: A Personal History of L.A. Punk – Various Artists
 Unfaithful Music & Disappearing Ink – Elvis Costello

Comedy
Best Comedy Album
 Talking for Clapping – Patton Oswalt ...America...Great... – David Cross
 American Myth – Margaret Cho
 Boyish Girl Interrupted – Tig Notaro
 Live at the Apollo – Amy Schumer

Musical Theatre
 Best Musical Theater Album
 The Color Purple – Danielle Brooks, Cynthia Erivo & Jennifer Hudson, principal soloists; Stephen Bray, Van Dean, Frank Filipetti, Roy Furman, Joan Raffe, Scott Sanders & Jhett Tolentino, producers; (Stephen Bray, Brenda Russell & Allee Willis, composers/lyricists) (New Broadway Cast)Bright Star – Carmen Cusack, principal soloist; Jay Alix, Peter Asher & Una Jackman, producers; Steve Martin, composer; Edie Brickell, composer & lyricist (Original Broadway Cast)
Fiddler on the Roof  – Danny Burstein, principal soloist; Louise Gund, David Lai & Ted Sperling, producers; (Jerry Bock, composer; Sheldon Harnick, lyricist) (2016 Broadway Cast)
Kinky Boots – Killian Donnelly & Matt Henry, principal soloists; Sammy James, Jr., Cyndi Lauper, Stephen Oremus & William Wittman, producers; (Cyndi Lauper, composer & lyricist) (Original West End Cast)
Waitress – Jessie Mueller, principal soloist; Neal Avron, Sara Bareilles & Nadia DiGiallonardo, producers; Sara Bareilles, composer & lyricist (Original Broadway Cast)

Music for Visual Media
Best Compilation Soundtrack for Visual Media
 Miles Ahead – (Miles Davis & Various Artists) Steve Berkowitz, Don Cheadle & Robert Glasper, compilation producers Amy – (Various Artists)
 Salaam Remi & Mark Ronson, compilation producers
 Straight Outta Compton – (Various Artists)
 O'Shea Jackson & Andre Young, compilation producers
 Suicide Squad (Collector's Edition) – (Various Artists)
 Mike Caren, Darren Higman & Kevin Weaver, compilation producers
 Vinyl: The Essentials Season 1 – (Various Artists)
 Stewart Lerman, Randall Poster & Kevin Weaver, compilation producers

Best Score Soundtrack for Visual Media
 Star Wars: The Force Awakens – John Williams, composer Bridge of Spies – Thomas Newman, composer
 The Hateful Eight – Ennio Morricone, composer
 The Revenant – Alva Noto & Ryuichi Sakamoto, composers
 Stranger Things, Vol. 1 – Kyle Dixon & Michael Stein, composers
 Stranger Things, Vol. 2 – Kyle Dixon & Michael Stein, composers

 Best Song Written for Visual Media"Can't Stop the Feeling!" – Max Martin, Shellback & Justin Timberlake, songwriters (performed by Justin Timberlake, Anna Kendrick, Gwen Stefani, James Corden, Zooey Deschanel, Walt Dohrn, Ron Funches, Caroline Hjelt, Aino Jawo, Christopher Mintz-Plasse & Kunal Nayyar)"Heathens" – Tyler Joseph, songwriter (performed by Twenty One Pilots)
"Just Like Fire" – Oscar Holter, Max Martin, Pink & Shellback, songwriters (performed by Pink)
"Purple Lamborghini" – Shamann Cooke, Sonny Moore & William Roberts, songwriters (performed by Skrillex & Rick Ross) 
"Try Everything" – Mikkel S. Eriksen, Sia & Tor Erik Hermansen, songwriters (performed by Shakira)
"The Veil" – Peter Gabriel, songwriter (performed by Peter Gabriel)

Composing
Best Instrumental Composition
 "Spoken at Midnight" Ted Nash, composer (Ted Nash Big Band) "Bridge of Spies (End Title)"
 Thomas Newman, composer (Thomas Newman)
 "The Expensive Train Set (An Epic Sarahnade for Big Band)"
 Tim Davies, composer (Tim Davies Big Band)
 "Flow"
 Alan Ferber, composer (Alan Ferber Nonet)
 "L'Ultima Diligenza Di Red Rock – Verisione Integrale"
 Ennio Morricone, composer (Ennio Morricone)

Arranging
Best Arrangement, Instrumental or A Cappella
 "You and I" Jacob Collier, arranger (Jacob Collier) "Ask Me Now" 
 John Beasley, arranger (John Beasley)
 "Good 'Swing' Wenceslas"
 Sammy Nestico, arranger (The Count Basie Orchestra)
 "Linus & Lucy"
 Christian Jacob, arranger (The Phil Norman Tentet)
 "Lucy in the Sky with Diamonds"
 John Daversa, arranger (John Daversa)
 "We Three Kings"
 Ted Nash, arranger (Jazz At Lincoln Center Orchestra With Wynton Marsalis)

Best Arrangement, Instruments and Vocals
 "Flintstones" Jacob Collier, arranger (Jacob Collier) "Do You Hear What I Hear?"
 Gordon Goodwin, arranger2 (Gordon Goodwin's Big Phat Band Featuring Take 6)
 "Do You Want to Know a Secret
 John Daversa, arranger (John Daversa Featuring Renee Olstead)
 "The Music"
 Alan Broadbent, arranger (Kristin Chenoweth)
 "Somewhere (Dirty Blvd) (Extended Version)"
 Billy Childs & Larry Klein, arrangers (Lang Lang Featuring Lisa Fischer & Jeffrey Wright)

Packaging
Best Recording Package
 Blackstar
 Jonathan Barnbrook, art director (David Bowie)
 Anti (Deluxe Edition) 
 Ciarra Pardo & Robyn Fenty, art directors (Rihanna)
 Human Performance
 Andrew Savage, art director (Parquet Courts)
 Sunset Motel 
 Sarah Dodds & Shauna Dodds, art directors (Reckless Kelly)
 22, A Million 
 Eric Timothy Carlson, art director (Bon Iver)

Best Boxed or Special Limited Edition Package
 Édith Piaf 1915–2015
 Gérard Lo Monaco, art director (Édith Piaf)
 401 Days
 Jonathan Dagan & Mathias Høst Normark, art directors (J.Views)
 I Like It When You Sleep, For You Are So Beautiful Yet So Unaware Of It
 Samuel Burgess-Johnson & Matthew Healy, art directors (The 1975)
 Paper Wheels (Deluxe Limited Edition) 
 Matt Taylor, art director (Trey Anastasio)
 Tug of War (Deluxe Edition) 
 Simon Earith & James Musgrave, art directors (Paul McCartney)

Notes
Best Album Notes
 Sissle and Blake Sing Shuffle Along
 Ken Bloom & Richard Carlin, album notes writers (Eubie Blake & Noble Sissle)
 The Complete Monument & Columbia Albums Collection 
 Mikal Gilmore, album notes writer (Kris Kristofferson)
 The Knoxville Sessions, 1929–1930: Knox County Stomp
 Ted Olson & Tony Russell, album notes writers (Various Artists)
 Ork Records: New York, New York
 Rob Sevier & Ken Shipley, album notes writers (Various Artists)
 Waxing The Gospel: Mass Evangelism & The Phonograph, 1890–1990 
 Richard Martin, album notes writer (Various Artists)

Historical
Best Historical Album
 The Cutting Edge 1965–1966: The Bootleg Series, Vol. 12 (Collector's Edition) Steve Berkowitz & Jeff Rosen, compilation producers; Mark Wilder, mastering engineer (Bob Dylan) Music of Morocco from the Library of Congress: Recorded By Paul Bowles, 1959
 April G. Ledbetter, Steven Lance Ledbetter, Bill Nowlin & Philip D. Schuyler, compilation producers; Rick Fisher & Michael Graves, mastering engineers (Various Artists)
 Ork Records: New York, New York
 Rob Sevier & Ken Shipley, compilation producers; Jeff Lipton & Maria Rice, mastering engineers (Various Artists)
 Vladimir Horowitz: The Unreleased Live Recordings 1966–1983 
 Bernard Horowitz, Andreas K. Meyer & Robert Russ, compilation producers; Andreas K. Meyer & Jeanne Montalvo, mastering engineers (Vladimir Horowitz)
 Waxing The Gospel: Mass Evangelism & the Phonograph, 1890–1990 
 Michael Devecka, Meagan Hennessey & Richard Martin, compilation producers; Michael Devecka, David Giovannoni, Michael Khanchalian & Richard Martin, mastering engineers (Various Artists)

Engineered Album
Best Engineered Album, Non-Classical
 Blackstar
 David Bowie, Tom Elmhirst, Kevin Killen & Tony Visconti, engineers; Joe LaPorta, mastering engineer (David Bowie)
 Are You Serious 
 Tchad Blake & David Boucher, engineers; Bob Ludwig, mastering engineer (Andrew Bird)
 Dig In Deep
 Ryan Freeland, engineer; Kim Rosen, mastering engineer (Bonnie Raitt)
 Hit N Run Phase Two 
 Booker T., Dylan Dresdow, Chris James, Prince & Justin Stanley, engineers; Dylan Dresdow, mastering engineer (Prince)
 Undercurrent 
 Shani Gandhi & Gary Paczosa, engineers; Paul Blakemore, mastering engineer (Sarah Jarosz)

Best Engineered Album, Classical
 The Ghosts of Versailles
 Mark Donahue, Fred Vogler & David L Williams, engineers (James Conlon, Guanqun Yu, Joshua Guerrero, Patricia Racette, Christopher Maltman, Lucy Schaufer, Lucas Meachem, Los Angeles Opera Chorus and Orchestra)
 Dutilleux: Sur le même accord; Les Citations; Mystère de l'instant & Timbres, espace, mouvement
 Alexander Lipay & Dmitriy Lipay, engineers (Ludovic Morlot & Seattle Symphony)
 Reflections
 Morten Lindberg, engineer (Øyvind Gimse, Geir Inge Lotsberg & Trondheimsolistene)
 Shadow of Sirius 
 Silas Brown & David Frost, engineers; Silas Brown
 Shostakovich: Under Stalin's Shadow – Symphonies Nos. 5, 8 & 9 
 Shawn Murphy & Nick Squire, engineers; Tim Martyn, mastering engineer (Andris Nelsons & Boston Symphony Orchestra)

Producer
Producer of the Year, Non-Classical
 Greg Kurstin
 "Cheap Thrills" (Sia featuring Sean Paul) 
 "Hello" (Adele) 
 Love You to Death (Tegan and Sara) 
 "Million Years Ago" (Adele) 
 "Something in the Way You Move" (Ellie Goulding) 
 "Water Under the Bridge" (Adele)
 Benny Blanco
 "Cold Water" (Major Lazer featuring Justin Bieber & MØ) 
 "Friends" (Francis and the Lights featuring Bon Iver) 
 "Kill Em with Kindness" (Selena Gomez) 
 "Love Yourself" (Justin Bieber) 
 "Luv" (Tory Lanez) 
 "Wild Love" (Cashmere Cat featuring The Weeknd & Francis and the Lights)
 Max Martin
 "Can't Stop the Feeling!" (Justin Timberlake) 
 "Dangerous Woman" (Ariana Grande) 
 "Into You" (Ariana Grande) 
 "Just Like Fire" (Pink) 
 "Rise" (Katy Perry) 
 "Send My Love (To Your New Lover)" (Adele)
 "Side to Side" (Ariana Grande featuring Nicki Minaj)
 Nineteen85
 "For Free" (DJ Khaled featuring Drake) 
 "Hotline Bling" (Drake) 
 "Not Nice" (PartyNextDoor) 
 "One Dance" (Drake featuring Wizkid & Kyla) 
 "Rising Water" (James Vincent McMorrow) 
 Sept. 5th (dvsn) 
 "Too Good" (Drake featuring Rihanna) 
 We Move (James Vincent McMorrow)
 Ricky Reed
 "Better" (Meghan Trainor featuring Yo Gotti) 
 "Cruel World" (Phantogram) 
 "Girls Talk Boys" (5 Seconds of Summer) 
 "HandClap" (Fitz and the Tantrums) 
 "Me Too" (Meghan Trainor) 
 "No" (Meghan Trainor) 
 "Sober" (DJ Snake featuring JRY) 
 "You Don't Get Me High Anymore" (Phantogram)

Producer of the Year, Classical
 David Frost
Bach: The Cello Suites According to Anna Magdalena (Matt Haimovitz)
 Bates: Anthology of Fantastic Zoology (Riccardo Muti & Chicago Symphony Orchestra)
 Beethoven: Piano Sonatas, Vol. 5 (Jonathan Biss)
 Brahms & Dvořák: Serenades (Boston Symphony Chamber Players)
 Fitelberg: Chamber Works (ARC Ensemble)
 Ispirare (Melia Watras)
 Overtures to Bach (Matt Haimovitz)
 Schoenberg: Kol Nidre; Shostakovich: Suite on Verses of Michelangelo Buonarroti (Ildar Abdrazakov, Alberto Mizrahi, Riccardo Muti, Duain Wolfe, Chicago Symphony Orchestra and Chorus)
 Shadow of Sirius (Jerry F. Junkin and The University Of Texas Wind Ensemble)
 Blanton Alspaugh
 The Aeolian Organ at Duke University Chapel (Christopher Jacobson) 
 Bolcom: Canciones De Lorca & Prometheus (René Barbera, Jeffrey Biegel, Carl St. Clair, Pacific Chorale & Pacific Symphony) 
 Brahms: The Four Symphonies (Leonard Slatkin & Detroit Symphony Orchestra)
 Copland: Appalachian Spring Complete Ballet; Hear Ye! Hear Ye! (Leonard Slatkin & Detroit Symphony Orchestra)
 Corigliano: The Ghosts of Versailles (James Conlon, Guanqun Yu, Joshua Guerrero, Patricia Racette, Christopher Maltman, Lucy Schaufer, Lucas Meachem, Los Angeles Opera Chorus & Orchestra) 
 Dvořák: Symphonies Nos. 7 & 8 (Andrés Orozco-Estrada & Houston Symphony) 
 Dvořák: Symphony No. 6; Slavonic Dances (Andrés Orozoco-Estrada & Houston Symphony) 
 Floyd: Wuthering Heights (Joseph Mechavich, Heather Buck, Vale Rideout, Susanne Mentzer, Kelly Markgraf, Georgia Jarman, Milwaukee Symphony Orchestra & Florentine Opera Company)
 Marina A. Ledin, Victor Ledin
 Friedman: Original Piano Compositions (Joseph Banowetz) 
 Moszkowski: From Foreign Lands (Martin West & San Francisco Ballet Orchestra)
 Judith Sherman
 American First Sonatas (Cecile Licad) 
 Berlin: This Is The Life! (Rick Benjamin & Paragon Ragtime Orchestra) 
 Centennial Commissions, Vol. II (Charles Neidich & Pro Arte Quartet) 
 Gernsheim & Brahms: Piano Quintets (Reiko Uchida & Formosa Quartet) 
 Latin American & Spanish Masterpieces For Flute & Piano (Stephanie Jutt) 
 Similar Motion (Momenta Quartet) 
 Tchaikovsky: Complete Works For Violin & Orchestra (Jennifer Koh, Alexander Vedernikov & Odense Symphony Orchestra) 
 Tower: String Quartets Nos. 3-5 & Dumbarton Quintet (Miami String Quartet)
 Robina G. Young
 Johnson: Considering Matthew Shepard (Craig Hella Johnson & Conspirare) 
 Lutosławski: Concerto For Orchestra; Brahms: Piano Quartet (Miguel Harth-Bedoya & Fort Worth Symphony Orchestra) 
 Mozart: Keyboard Music, Vols. 8 & 9 (Kristian Bezuidenhout) 
 Prokofiev: Piano Concertos Nos. 2 & 5 (Vadym Kholodenko, Miguel Harth-Bedoya & Fort Worth Symphony Orchestra) 
 A Wondrous Mystery – Renaissance Choral Music for Christmas (Stile Antico)

Remixer
Best Remixed Recording, Non-Classical
 "Tearing Me Up" (RAC Remix)
 André Allen Anjos, remixer (Bob Moses)
 '"Cali Coast" (Psionics Remix) 
 Josh Williams, remixer (Soul Pacific)
 "Heavy Star Movin'" (staRo Remix)
 staRo, remixer (The Silver Lake Chorus)
 "Nineteen Hundred and Eighty-Five" (Timo Maas & James Teej Remix)
 Timo Maas & James Teej, remixers (Paul McCartney & Wings)
 "Only" (Kaskade × Lipless Remix)
 Kaskade & Lipless, remixer (Ry X)
 "Wide Open" (Joe Goddard Remix)
 Joe Goddard, remixer (The Chemical Brothers)

Surround Sound
Best Surround Sound Album
 Dutilleux: Sur le même accord; Les Citations; Mystère de l'instant & Timbres, espace, mouvement
 Alexander Lipay & Dmitriy Lipay, surround mix engineers; Dmitriy Lipay, surround mastering engineer; Dmitriy Lipay, surround producer (Ludovic Morlot & Seattle Symphony)
 Johnson: Considering Matthew Shephard
 Brad Michel, surround mix engineer; Brad Michel, surround mastering engineer; Robina G. Young, surround producer (Craig Hella Johnson & Conspirare)
 Maja S.K. Ratkje: And Sing ...
 Morten Lindberg, surround mix engineer; Morten Lindberg, surround mastering engineer; Morten Lindberg, surround producer (Maja S.K. Ratkje, Cikada & Oslo Sinfonietta)
 Primus & The Chocolate Factory 
 Les Claypool, surround mix engineer; Stephen Marcussen, surround mastering engineer; Les Claypool, surround producer (Primus)
 Reflections
 Morten Lindberg, surround mix engineer; Morten Lindberg, surround mastering engineer; Morten Lindberg, surround producer (Øyvind Gimse, Geir Inge Lotsberg & Trondheimsolistene)

Classical
Best Orchestral Performance
 Shostakovich: Under Stalin's Shadow – Symphonies Nos. 5, 8 & 9
 Andris Nelsons, conductor (Boston Symphony Orchestra)
 Bates: Works for Orchestra 
 Michael Tilson Thomas, conductor (San Francisco Symphony)
 Ibert: Orchestral Works
 Neeme Järvi, conductor (Orchestre de la Suisse Romande)
 Prokofiev: Symphony No. 5 In B-flat major, Op. 100
 Mariss Jansons, conductor (Royal Concertgebouw Orchestra)
 Rouse: Odna Zhizn; Symphonies 3 & 4; Prospero's Rooms 
 Alan Gilbert, conductor (New York Philharmonic)

Best Opera Recording
 Corigliano: The Ghosts of Versailles
 James Conlon, conductor; Joshua Guerrero, Christopher Maltman, Lucas Meachem, Patricia Racette, Lucy Schaufer & Guanqun Yu, soloists; Blanton Alspaugh, producer (Los Angeles Opera Orchestra and Chorus)
 Handel: Giulio Cesare 
 Giovanni Antonini, conductor; Cecilia Bartoli, Philippe Jaroussky, Andreas Scholl & Anne-Sofie von Otter, soloists; Samuel Theis, producer (Il Giardino Armonico)
 Higdon: Cold Mountain 
 Miguel Harth-Bedoya, conductor; Emily Fons, Nathan Gunn, Isabel Leonard & Jay Hunter Morris, soloists; Elizabeth Ostrow, producer (The Santa Fe Opera Orchestra; Santa Fe Opera Apprentice Program for Singers) 
 Mozart: Le Nozze De Figaro 
 Yannick Nézet-Séguin, conductor; Thomas Hampson, Christiane Karg, Luca Pisaroni & Sonya Yoncheva, soloists; Daniel Zalay, producer (Chamber Orchestra of Europe; Vocalensemble Rastatt)
 Szymanowski: Król Roger 
 Antonio Pappano, conductor; Georgia Jarman, Mariusz Kwiecień & Saimir Pirgu, soloists; Jonathan Allen, producer (Orchestra Of The Royal Opera House; Royal Opera Chorus)

Best Choral Performance
 Penderecki Conducts Penderecki, Volume 1
 Krzysztof Penderecki, conductor; Henryk Wojnarowski, choir director (Nikolay Didenko, Agnieszka Rehlis & Johanna Rusanen, soloists; Warsaw Philharmonic Orchestra, orchestra; Warsaw Philharmonic Choir, choir)
 Himmelrand 
 Elisabeth Holte, conductor (Marianne Reidarsdatter Eriksen, Ragnfrid Lie & Matilda Sterby, soloists; Inger-Lise Ulsrud, accompanist; Uranienborg Vokalensemble, choir)
 Janáček: Glagolitic Mass 
 Edward Gardner, conductor; Håkon Matti Skrede, chorus master (Susan Bickley, Gábor Bretz, Sara Jakubiak & Stuart Skelton, soloists; Thomas Trotter, accompanist; Bergen Philharmonic Orchestra, orchestra; Bergen Cathedral Choir, Bergen Philharmonic Choir, Choir of Collegium Musicum & Edvard Grieg Kor, choirs)
 Lloyd: Bonhoeffer 
 Donald Nally, conductor (Malavika Godbole, John Grecia, Rebecca Harris & Thomas Mesa, soloists; The Crossing, ensemble)
 Steinberg: Passion Week 
 Steven Fox, conductor (The Clarion Choir)

Best Chamber Music/Small Ensemble Performance
 Third Coast Percussion
 Steve Reich
 Fitelberg: Chamber Works 
 ARC Ensemble
 Reflections 
 Øyvind Gimse, Geir Inge Lotsberg & Trondheimsolistene
 Serious Business
 Spektral Quartet
 Trios from Our Homelands 
 Lincoln Trio

Best Classical Instrumental Solo
 Daugherty: Tales of Hemingway
 Zuill Bailey; Giancarlo Guerrero, conductor (Nashville Symphony)
 Adams, J.: Scheherazade.2
 Leila Josefowicz; David Robertson, conductor (Chester Englander; St. Louis Symphony)
 Dvorák: Violin Concerto & Romance; Suk: Fantasy 
 Christian Tetzlaff; John Storgårds, conductor (Helsinki Philharmonic Orchestra)
 Mozart: Keyboard Music, Vols. 8 & 9 
 Kristian Bezuidenhout
 1930's Violin Concertos, Vol. 2
 Gil Shaham; Stéphane Denève, conductor (The Knights & Stuttgart Radio Symphony Orchestra)

Best Classical Solo Vocal Album
 Schumann & Berg
 Dorothea Röschmann; Mitsuko Uchida, accompanist
 Shakespeare Songs
 Ian Bostridge; Antonio Pappano, accompanist (Michael Collins, Elizabeth Kenny, Lawrence Power & Adam Walker)
 Monteverdi 
 Magdalena Kožená; Andrea Marcon, conductor (David Feldman, Michael Feyfar, Jakob Pilgram & Luca Tittoto; La Cetra Barockorchester Basel)
 Mozart: The Weber Sisters
 Sabine Devieilhe; Raphaël Pichon, conductor (Pygmalion)
 Verismo
 Anna Netrebko; Antonio Pappano, conductor (Yusif Eyvazov; Coro Dell'Accademia Nazionale Di Santa Cecilia; Orchestra Dell'Accademia Nazionale Di Santa Cecilia)

Best Classical Compendium
 Daugherty: Tales of Hemingway; American Gothic; Once Upon a Castle
 Giancarlo Guerrero, conductor; Tim Handley, producer
 Gesualdo
 Tõnu Kaljuste, conductor; Manfred Eicher, producer
 Vaughan Williams: Discoveries
 Martyn Brabbins, conductor; Ann McKay, producer
 Wolfgang: Passing Through
 Judith Farmer & Gernot Wolfgang, producers
 Zappa: 200 Motels
 The Suites – Esa-Pekka Salonen, conductor; Frank Filipetti & Gail Zappa, producers

Best Contemporary Classical Composition
 Daugherty: Tales of Hemingway
 Michael Daugherty, composer (Zuill Bailey, Giancarlo Guerrero & Nashville Symphony)
 Bates: Anthology of Fantastic Zoology
 Mason Bates, composer (Riccardo Muti & Chicago Symphony Orchestra)
 Higdon: Cold Mountain
 Jennifer Higdon, composer; Gene Scheer, librettist
 Theofanidis: Bassoon Concerto
 Christopher Theofanidis, composer (Martin Kuuskmann, Barry Jekowsky & Northwest Sinfonia)
 Winger: Conversations with Nijinsky
 C. F. Kip Winger, composer (Martin West & San Francisco Ballet Orchestra)

Music Video/Film
Best Music Video
 "Formation" – Beyoncé
 Melina Matsoukas, video director; Candice Dragonas, Juliette Larthe, Nathan Scherrer & Inga Veronique, video producers
 "River" – Leon Bridges
 Miles Jay, video director; Dennis Beier, Allison Kunzman & Saul Levitz, video producers
 "Up & Up" – Coldplay
 Vania Heymann & Gal Muggia, video directors; Candice Dragonas, Juliette Larthe, Nathan Scherrer & Natan Schottenfels, video producers
 "Gosh" – Jamie XX
 Romain Gavras, video director; Iconoclast, video producers
 "Upside Down & Inside Out" – OK Go
 Damian Kulash Jr. & Trish Sie, video directors; Melissa Murphy & John O'Grady, video producers

Best Music Film
 The Beatles: Eight Days a Week The Touring Years – (The Beatles)
 Ron Howard, video director; Brian Grazer, Ron Howard, Scott Pascucci & Nigel Sinclair, video producers
 I'll Sleep When I'm Dead – Steve Aoki
 Justin Krook, video director; Brent Almond, Matt Colon, David Gelb, Ryan Kavanaugh, Michael Theanne, Happy Walters & Matthew Weaver, video producers
 Lemonade – Beyoncé
 Beyoncé Knowles Carter & Kahlil Joseph, video directors; Ed Burke, Steve Pamon, Todd Tourso, Dora Melissa Vargas, Erinn Williams & Beyoncé Knowles Carter, video producer
 The Music of Strangers – Yo-Yo Ma & The Silk Road Ensemble
 Morgan Neville, video director; Caitrin Rogers, video producer
 American Saturday Night: Live From The Grand Ole Opry – (Various Artists)
 George J. Flanigen IV, video director; Steve Buchanan, John Burke & Lindsey Clark, Robert Deaton, Pete Fisher & George J. Flanigen IV, video producers

Special Merit Awards

MusiCares Person of the Year
 Tom Petty

Lifetime Achievement Award
 Shirley Caesar
 Ahmad Jamal
 Charley Pride
 Jimmie Rodgers
 Nina Simone
 Sly Stone
 The Velvet Underground

Trustees Award
 Thom Bell
 Mo Ostin
 Ralph S. Peer

Technical Grammy Award
 Alan Dower Blumlein

Music Educator Award
 Keith Hancock (of Tesoro High School in Las Flores, California)

Grammy Hall of Fame inductions

In Memoriam
The following people appeared in the In Memoriam segment:

Prince
Leonard Cohen
Keith Emerson
Greg Lake
John Wetton
Sharon Jones
Wayne Jackson
Rod Temperton
James Jamerson, Jr.
Ralph Stanley
Merle Haggard
Sonny James
Scotty Moore
Joey Feek
Bobby Vee
Lonnie Mack
Butch Trucks
Juan Gabriel
Emilio Navaira
Mose Allison
Toots Thielemans
Gato Barbieri
Nat Hentoff
Rudy Van Gelder
George Michael
Debbie Reynolds
Guy Clark
John D. Loudermilk
Milt Okun
Joe Ligon
Stanley "Buckwater" Dural, Jr.
Billy Paul
Marvell Thomas
Bernie Worrell
Chips Moman
Pete Fountain
Frank Sinatra Jr.
Patrice Munsel
Zhou Xiaoyan
Sir Neville Marriner
Phife Dawg
Lee O'Denat
Muhammad Ali
Leon Russell
Howard Kaufman
Bill Ham
Phil Chess
Bob Krasnow
Tony Martell
Mary Stewart
James M. Nederlander
Chris Stone
Remo Belli
Sir George Martin

Multiple nominations and awards
The following received multiple nominations:

Nine:
Beyoncé
Eight:
Drake
Rihanna
Kanye West

Seven:
Chance the Rapper
Six:
Tom Elmhirst
Five:
Adele
Tyler Joseph

Four:
Justin Bieber
Benny Blanco
David Bowie
Tom Coyne
Mike Dean
Kirk Franklin
Greg Kurstin
Max Martin
Lori McKenna
Maren Morris

Three:

BJ the Chicago Kid
The Chainsmokers
John Daversa
Tom Elmhirst
Lukas Forchhammer
Jaycen Joshua

Morten Lindberg
Randy Merrill
Mike Will Made It
Ted Nash
Nineteen85
Antonio Pappano

Morten Ristorp
Noah "40" Shebib
Shellback
Sia
Twenty One Pilots
Jack White

Two:

Blanton Alspaugh
The Avett Brothers
Neal Avron
John Beasley
William Bell
Boi-1da
Julian Burg
John Burke
Noel "Gadget" Campbell
Shirley Caesar
Brandy Clark
Jacob Collier
Diplo
Kyle Dixon
The-Dream
Fat Joe
Frank Filipetti

Flume
Stefan Forrest
David Frost
Robbie Fulks
Chris Gehringer
Rhiannon Giddens
Gojira
Ariana Grande
Natalie Grant
Giancarlo Guerrero
Halsey
Lalah Hathaway
Emile Haynie
Fred Hersch
Hillary Scott & the Scott Family
Sarah Jarosz
Dave Kutch

Kendrick Lamar
Miranda Lambert
Lil Wayne
Alexander Lipay
Dmitriy Lipay
Liam Nolan
Lukas Graham
Remy Ma
Yo-Yo Ma & the Silk Road Ensemble
Manny Marroquin
Richard Martin
Brad Mehldau
French Montana
Ennio Morricone
Thomas Newman
Anderson .Paak
PartyNextDoor
Alex Pasco

Pink
Pluss
Kelly Price
Radiohead
Roddie Romero
ScHoolboy Q
Amy Schumer
John Scofield
Rob Sevier
Ken Shipley
Sturgill Simpson
Skrillex
Michael Stein
2 Chainz
Keith Urban
Stuart White
Robina G. Young

The following received multiple awards:

Six:
Tom Elmhirst
Five:
Adele

Four:
David Bowie
Greg Kurstin

Three:
Chance the Rapper

Two:

Beyoncé
Julian Burg
Jacob Collier
Tom Coyne
Drake
Kirk Franklin

Giancarlo Guerrero
Lalah Hathaway
Emile Haynie
Hillary Scott & the Scott Family
Sarah Jarosz

Max Martin
Randy Merrill
Ted Nash
John Scofield
Shellback

Changes
In June 2016, the Grammy organization announced a few minor changes to the voting and awarding process.

As of 2017, recordings released solely through streaming services will be eligible to enter the award process. These recordings will have to be available through streaming platforms. Applicable streaming services are paid subscription, full catalog, on-demand streaming/limited download platforms that have existed as such within the United States for at least one full year as of the submission deadline. All recordings entered must have an assigned International Standard Recording Code (ISRC).

Best New Artist guidelines
Existing Best New Artist rules were amended to remove the album barrier given current trends in how new music and developing artists are released and promoted. Currently many new artists first release singles, tracks, or EPs rather than full albums. To become eligible in the category of Best New Artist, the artist, duo, or group:
 Must have released a minimum of five singles/tracks or one album, but no more than 30 singles/tracks or three albums. 
 May not have entered the category more than three times, including as a performing member of an established group.
 Must have achieved a breakthrough into the public consciousness and impacted the musical landscape during the eligibility period.

Blues categories
The Best Blues Album category will branch into two distinct categories:
 Best Traditional Blues Album (Blues recordings with traditional blues song and harmonic structures, including various subgenres such as Delta blues, Piedmont blues, jump/swing blues, Chicago blues, and classic/Southern soul).
 Best Contemporary Blues Album (Recordings which may employ non-traditional blues rhythms such as funk, hip-hop, reggae, and rock, or which feature contemporary techniques such as synthesizers or loops).

It means a return to the situation prior to 2012, the year the categories were merged in a major overhaul.

Best Rap/Sung Collaboration category renamed
The Best Rap/Sung Collaboration category (in the Rap field) will be renamed as Best Rap/Sung Performance, to allow solo performances, a result of "the current state and future trajectory of rap by expanding the category beyond collaborations between rappers and vocalists to include recordings by a solo artist who blurs the lines between rapping and singing."

Additional amendments were made to the number and type of music creators recognized in the categories of Best Choral Performance and Best Jazz Vocal Album.

References

External links
 

 059
2017 awards in the United States
2017 in American music
2017 music awards
2017 in Los Angeles
February 2017 events in the United States